Ginka Zagorcheva-Boycheva,  (born 12 April 1958 in Plovdiv) is a former hurdling athlete from Bulgaria. Most notable for winning the 100 metres hurdles at the 1987 World Championships.  She held the world record for a year with a time of 12.25 sec, until it was beaten by Yordanka Donkova in August 1988. She also competed in the women's 100 metres hurdles at the 1988 Summer Olympics.

National titles
Five-time Bulgarian National Champion at 100 m hurdles, 1983, 85, 87, 89 & 90.

International competitions

References

External links

World Championships
European Indoor Championships
European Championships

1958 births
Living people
Bulgarian female hurdlers
World Athletics Championships medalists
European Athletics Championships medalists
Universiade medalists in athletics (track and field)
Athletes (track and field) at the 1988 Summer Olympics
Olympic athletes of Bulgaria
Goodwill Games medalists in athletics
Sportspeople from Plovdiv
Universiade gold medalists for Bulgaria
World Athletics Indoor Championships medalists
World Athletics Championships winners
Medalists at the 1985 Summer Universiade
Competitors at the 1986 Goodwill Games
People from Rakovski